is a Japanese anime series created by Rin Inumaru, produced by NHK Enterprises, and animated by Gallop. The series has aired on NHK E-Tele since October 1998, making it the second longest-running anime on NHK behind Nintama Rantaro, and the third longest-running anime series to date. The series focuses on a 5-year-old Heian-era prince named Ojarumaru Sakanoue who accidentally time-warps to modern Japan and has adventures there while dodging a trio of young oni who try to get back a scepter that he stole from Great King Enma. The series has been dubbed in many languages. It was the first NHK anime series to be animated using the digital ink-and-paint process instead of cels.

It received an "Excellence Award" for animation at the 1999 Japan Media Arts Festival.

Premise

Around 1,000 years ago in Fairy World (妖精界 Yōsei-kai) in the Heian era, a young prince from a noble family named Ojarumaru Sakanoue is bored of his life of privilege. He is later lured into Enma World (エンマ界 Enma-kai) by the sound of a ukulele played by Great King Enma. Upon arriving, he steals Great King Enma's powerful scepter, which he uses in order to judge the dead. While getting chased by Great King Enma, he accidentally falls into the Moon Hole (月の穴 Tsuki no Ana), which time-warps him to modern Japan via the Full Moon Road (満月ロード Mangetsu Rōdo). The furious Great King Enma sends his three adopted oni children, Aobei, Kisuke, and Akane, who are known as the "Little Child Trio" (子鬼トリオ Kooni Trio), to pursue Ojarumaru and get the scepter back. At the present time, Ojarumaru falls from the moon to the roof of Sakata Apartment (坂田マンション Sakata Manshon) where he befriends a boy named Kazuma Tamura and his grandfather Tommy. Fascinated with the prince, Tommy helps Kazuma convince his parents Ai and Makoto into letting Ojarumaru stay with the family, to which they accept. Denbo, Ojarumaru's anthropomorphic firefly caretaker who witnessed the latter falling into the Moon Hole, eventually finds and takes care of him at the request of his parents. While making many new friends and rivals, as well as dodging the Oni Child Trio's efforts to retrieve the scepter, Ojarumaru has many adventures in Moonlight Town (月光町 Gekkō-chō) and encounters new things he has never seen before in his time period.

Later episodes tend to center around other characters, including Princess Okame, Ojarumaru's young fiancé who desperately tries to win over his heart; Okorinbō and Nikorinbō, two anthropomorphic komainu who try numerous get-rich-quick methods in a bid to get their shinto shrine out of poverty; Ken, a freeter who keeps changing jobs; Kazuma's classmates, big eater Kintarō Sakata, beauty-obsessed Komachi Ono, and the judgmental but well-intentioned Kentarō Iwashimizu; Icchoku Honda, Kazuma's energetic homeroom teacher; the Hoshino Family, three aliens from another planet who want to invade earth and have a strange aversion to Ojarumaru; and Sachiyo Usui, an eccentric manga artist who is notorious for her creepy, highly detailed drawings.

Some episodes place the characters in parodies of notable fairy tales, fables, novels, and TV shows from Japan and other countries. These include Momotarō, Cinderella, Ikkyū-san, Journey to the West, Columbo, Peter Pan, The Boy Who Cried Wolf, Attack on Titan and James Bond.

Broadcast
Seven television specials have aired on NHK E-Tele. The first special entitled  aired on January 1, 2000. The second special entitled  aired on May 3, 2007. The third special entitled  aired on March 20, 2012. The fourth special entitled  aired on August 14, 2015. The fifth special entitled  aired in 2 parts on November 1 and 2, 2017. The sixth special entitled  aired on November 3, 2017. The seventh special  was scheduled to premiere on March 28, 2022, and was later delayed to March 30 due to a high school baseball tournament preempting the special's initial 9:00 AM timeslot on March 28.

The series has aired daily on Kids Station since November 5, 2018.

Soundtrack

Opening Themes

Ending Themes

Other media

Manga
A manga adaptation of the anime series, written and illustrated by Tatsuma Ejiri, was serialized in Shueisha's Saikyo Jump magazine from January 2012 to September 2014. The first and only tankōbon volume, which compiles select stories from the Saikyo Jump serialization, was published in Japan on July 4, 2014.

Video games

See also
Gag Manga Biyori
Nintama Rantaro
Doraemon
Sazae-san

Notes

References

External links
Official anime website 
NHK Anime World Ojarumaru  
Enoki Films Prince Mackaroo Website

Ojarumaru via Kids Station's official website 
Ojarumaru nep NHK Enterprises Character Page 
Peril at the Full Moon Road ~A 'Rare' Adventure of Our Prince~ Official site 
My Galaxy is Calling ~The 2 Wishing Stars~ Official site 

1998 anime television series debuts
1998 Japanese television series debuts
2000 anime films
2007 anime films
2012 manga
2012 anime films
Gallop (studio)
Anime television films
Fantasy anime and manga
Fictional princes
NHK original programming